Savojbolagh County is in Alborz province, Iran. The capital of the county is the city of Hashtgerd. At the 2006 census, when it was a county in Tehran province, its population was 215,086 in 57,497 households. At the 2016 census, the county's population was 259,973 in 80,953 households, by which time the county had joined the recently established Alborz province, and Taleqan District had been separated from the county to form Taleqan County. After the census, Chaharbagh District was separated from the county to become Chaharbagh County.

Administrative divisions

The population history and structural changes of Savojbolagh County's administrative divisions over two censuses are shown in the following table. The latest census shows three districts, six rural districts, and five cities.

History 
The name Sāvojbolāgh is derived from Turkish and means "cold springs". The 14th-century author Hamdallah Mustawfi described it as having "a fine climate"; most of its water was drawn from qanats, and it produced a lot of fruit and grain. He wrote that the district had previously been attached to Ray for fiscal purposes under the Seljuk Empire, but under Mongol rule it had been detached. Its inhabitants, he wrote, were nomads who were "indifferent to religious matters". The main villages were Sonqorabad, Najmabad, and Kharav. The district's tax revenues he listed as 12,000 dinars.

References 

 

Counties of Alborz Province